Graeme Power may refer to:

 Graeme Power (footballer, born 1977), English footballer
 Graeme Power (footballer, born 1959), English football goalkeeper